Lobaunia danubialis is a species of minute freshwater spring snails, aquatic gastropod mollusks or micromollusks in the family Hydrobiidae.

This species is endemic to Austria.

References

Lobaunia
Endemic fauna of Austria
Taxonomy articles created by Polbot
Taxobox binomials not recognized by IUCN